Opilia is a genus of approximately 33 species of lianas in the family Opiliaceae described as a genus in 1802.

Opilia is native to tropical and subtropical regions of Asia, Africa, Papuasia, and Australia.

Species
 Opilia afzelii - Sierra Leone
 Opilia amentacea - trop Africa, Madagascar, India, Sri Lanka, Yunnan, SE Asia, Papuasia, N Australia
 Opilia campestris - Ethiopia, Somalia, Kenya, Tanzania, Angola, Namibia
 Opilia congolana - Cameroon, Gabon, Equatorial Guinea, Democratic Republic of the Congo
 Opilia fragrans - Philippines

References

Opiliaceae
Santalales genera